September Mourning is a metal band, which incorporates a transmedia dark culture project created by Emily Lazar and Marc Silvestri. The conceptual project was formed by frontwoman, vocalist, and screamer Emily Lazar in New York in 2009. The concept narrative created by Lazar and incorporated in the band and their performances, centers around the fictional story of a human-grim reaper hybrid named September, as she navigates the worlds of the living and the dead. The character's human-side possesses the empathy to give some human souls a second chance. The story is presented on different media platforms, including music, comic books, and live concerts. The comic books are published by Top Cow Productions Image Comics.

History

Marc Silvestri of Top Cow Productions became involved after Lazar pitched the idea of the band to him via Myspace. Together, they developed the world and storyline of September Mourning. Lazar described the project:

In early 2009, Lazar began to focus on the project's music. Together with guitarist and programmer Chris Egert and guitarist James Duran, Lazar began writing songs and figuring out the sound for September Mourning. After moving from New York to Los Angeles in late 2010, Lazar became the only constant member. At the 2010 San Diego Comic-Con, Top Cow Productions announced the creation of Marc Silvestri and September's concept story, September Mourning, whose preview story summary would be published that year in the first edition of their Holiday Special. In late 2011, at the San Diego Comic Con, MTV Geek announced a partnership with Marc Silvestri and September to create webisodes based on the characters in the storyline September Mourning, as well as online comics and other media for their website, and David Hine signed on as writer for the series. The unfortunate cancellation of MTV Geek led to the webisodes never coming to fruition.

At the start of 2011, Egert and Lazar began self-producing an album containing the first demo songs written by the band. Melancholia was released on Repo Records exclusively in Germany on May 18, 2012, and features guest drummer Ryan Seaman of Falling in Reverse and bassist Phil Buckman of Filter. The album was mixed and mastered by Dave Ogilvie. On July 17, 2012, a demo of a new song, Before the Fall, co-written and produced by Sahaj Ticotin, and its music video, were featured in the TNA Wrestling commercial for their Hardcore Justice PPV August 2012. This single was released independently to the digital media outlets the following week and showcased the progression of the band's songwriting and move towards a more commercial sound. In September 2013 they played the Schecter Guitars party at NAMM. Lazar continued to develop the look and theatricality of the band and to write new material for the project. They played some one-off shows in the California area while being shopped to labels.

In early 2014 the band was signed to Virgin Records and started writing and recording their US debut. In mid 2014 a new song premiered on CrypticRock called "Superhuman", co-written by Kane Churko. Later that year, the band premiered a new song, "Children of Fate", co-written by Sahaj Ticotin and produced by Howard Benson on Loudwire. Sometime in 2015, their deal with Virgin Records was cut short because of the person that signed them into the label being terminated from his position. On July 12, 2015, September Mourning launched a Kickstarter campaign to fund the release of the first issue of a comic book connected to the project's storyline. The campaign achieved its funding goal in under 72 hours. In September, Loudwire premiered another track from their debut EP, Eye of the Storm. The EP, mixed and produced by Sahaj Ticotin, was released on October 2, 2015, through T-Boy Records.

The comic titled A Murder of Reapers, was released in October 2015 through Top Cow Productions/Image Comics alongside Volume I, the band's first release in the US. The Front Row Report said, "all components of the project's impact present the sensation of strength and vitality. With such a unique method of storytelling and direct communication of passion, September Mourning have set themselves up for success with Volume 1". Live-metal.net stated that "in less than 20 minutes, Volume I establishes September Mourning as one of the few truly unique acts active today. The title implies this is the only beginning, which is a promising, exciting thought."

The band signed to Sumerian Records in March 2016, and released the music video for "Eye of the Storm". The full-length album, Volume II produced by Sahaj Ticotin, was released on July 29, 2016, alongside the second issue of the comic. Lazar stated that "Volume II is a continuation of the first step in our journey which began with our self-released EP, Volume I and A Murder of Reapers, the first issue of our comic book. Volume II follows our hero, September Mourning's tale throughout the second issue of the comic book entitled, The Hand of Fate". To promote the release, an animated lyric video for "Skin and Bones" premiered on Loudwire in July 2016. Later in July the album released, being produced by Sajah Ticotin and containing 12 tracks. In January 2017 the music video for "20 Below" was released. The song peaked at number 39 on Hot Mainstream Rock Tracks. The final single from the album "'Til You See Heaven" released in August.

In 2018 the band released two new singles "Empire" and "Glass Animals". At some point in 2019 they became independent and began works on their second EP, Volume III. In July the band released the first single off of the EP, "Unholy", accompanied by a music video that was a complication of footage from the band's previous live performances. The second single, "Hiding from Heaven" released in September accompanied with an animated music video representing September Mourning's comic book style. In December, two days before the official release of the EP, the third song was revealed called "Overdose" with its music video. The EP released on December 13, including four tracks. In April 2020 the band released the music video for "Madness".

On October 3, 2020, the song, "Wake the Dead", was announced with the release date of December 11. The song has been confirmed to be the first single from their new album, Volume IV. On December 11 the song released as expected. Their new single "Kill This Love" was announced on January 25 with the release date of February 19, after being teased the day before.

Band members
Current
 Emily "September Mourning" Lazar – lead vocals, keyboards (2009–present)
 Rich Juzwick – guitars, backing vocals (2014–present), bass (2018–present)
 Kyle Mayer – drums (2018–present)
 Aaron Hoover – guitars (2020–present)

Former
 James Duran – guitars, bass (2009–2012)
 Chris Egert – guitars, bass, programming (2009–2012)
 Andrew Brown – bass (2011–2012)
 Nobuaki Hayashi – guitars (2012)
 Steve Podgorski – guitars (2012–2013)
 Xavier Moreux – guitars (2014–2015)
 Skot Christ – bass, backing vocals (2012–2013)
 Shawn Cameron – drums (2012–2013)
 Tommy Joe Ratliff – bass (2014–2015)
 Clayton Ryan – bass (2015)
 Jeriah Eager – bass (2015–2016)
 Andy DeCicco – bass (2016–2018)
 Kyle Ort – guitars (2015–2017)
 Josh Fresia – drums (2014–2018)
 Patrick Romanelli – guitars, backing vocals (2017–2020), bass (2018–2020)

Timeline

Discography

Studio albums

EPs

Singles

References

External links
 
Top Cow Holiday Special Volume 1; December 2010 at the Comic Book DB
RVAFreaks; June 2010
/ 10 questions with Emily Lazar 

American hard rock musical groups
American alternative rock groups
American electronic musicians
Musical quartets
Female-fronted musical groups